Joseph Jackson Gravely (September 25, 1828 – April 28, 1872) was a nineteenth-century politician, lawyer and teacher from Virginia and Missouri.

Biography
Born near Leatherwood, Henry County, Virginia, Gravely attended public schools as a child, engaged in agricultural pursuits and taught school. He studied law and was admitted to the bar, commencing practice in Virginia. He was a member of the Virginia House of Delegates in 1853 and 1854, moved to Missouri in 1854 and was a delegate to the Missouri Constitutional Convention in 1860. During the Civil War, Gravely served as colonel of the 8th Missouri State Militia Cavalry Regiment in the Union Army and was a member of the Missouri Senate in 1862 and 1864. He was elected a Republican to the United States House of Representatives in 1866, serving from 1867 to 1869, and was elected the 15th Lieutenant Governor of Missouri in 1870 serving under Governor B. Gratz Brown, serving from 1871 until his death in Stockton, Missouri on April 28, 1872. He was interred in Lindley Prairie Cemetery near Bear Creek, Missouri.

External links

 Retrieved on 2008-10-18

1828 births
1872 deaths
Members of the Virginia House of Delegates
Missouri state senators
Lieutenant Governors of Missouri
Virginia lawyers
Missouri lawyers
Union Army colonels
People of Missouri in the American Civil War
Republican Party members of the United States House of Representatives from Missouri
Missouri Liberal Republicans
19th-century American politicians
19th-century American lawyers